Philipp Dmitrievich Mukhometov (born 25 November 1983) is a Russian former professional tennis player.

Mukhometov, who comes from Moscow, was a member of Russia's 2001 Sunshine Cup winning team and won a silver medal in singles at the 2001 Summer Universiade in Beijing. On the professional tour, Mukhometov had a best singles ranking of 355 in the world and won two ITF Futures titles. He made his only ATP Tour main draw appearance as a doubles player, at the Kremlin Cup in 2005, reaching the quarter-finals.

Challenger/Futures titles

Singles

Doubles

References

External links
 
 

1983 births
Living people
Russian male tennis players
Tennis players from Moscow
Universiade medalists in tennis
Universiade silver medalists for Russia
Medalists at the 2001 Summer Universiade